The battle of Czasniki can refer to these battles:

 Battle of Czasniki (1564) during the Livonian War
 Battle of Czasniki (1567) during the Livonian War
 Battle of Czasniki (1812) during the French invasion of Russia